Nizar Samlal (born May 16, 1979) is a Moroccan slalom canoer who competed from the late 1990s to the mid-2000s. He finished in 20th place in the K-1 event at the 2000 Summer Olympics in Sydney after being eliminated in the qualifying round.

References
Sports-Reference.com profile

1979 births
Canoeists at the 2000 Summer Olympics
Living people
Moroccan male canoeists
Olympic canoeists of Morocco